The 1891 Cornell Big Red football team was an American football team that represented Cornell University during the 1891 college football season.  The team compiled a 7–3 record and outscored all opponents by a combined total of 298 to 34.

Schedule

References

Cornell
Cornell Big Red football seasons
Cornell Big Red football